Francesco "Nino" Castelnuovo (28 October 1936 – 6 September 2021) was an Italian actor of film, stage and television, best known for his starring role as Guy Foucher in the French musical film The Umbrellas of Cherbourg (1964).

Castelnuovo's other films include Rocco and His Brothers (1960), Camille 2000 (1969), L'emmerdeur (1973), Il prato macchiato di rosso (1973),  Massacre Time (1966), The Five Man Army (1969), and The English Patient (1996).

Early life 
Castelnuovo was born the youngest of three boys in Lecco, Lombardy as the son of maid Emilia Paola (née Sala) and button factory employee Camillo Castelnuovo. He had two older brothers, Pierantonio (b. 1930; d. 1976) and Clemente. After being a house painter, a mechanic and a workman, he moved to Milan, where he started working as a sales agent, and at the same time, he enrolled in the acting school of the Piccolo Teatro in Milan.
He became a father for the first time to his son Lorenzo when he married Danila Trebbi (b. 1955), an Italian actress.

Career 
In 1957, Castelnuovo debuted as a mime in the RAI children's television show Zurli il mago del giovedì. 

He landed a small part in Un maledetto imbroglio (The Facts of Murder, 1959), directed by Pietro Germi, and played supporting roles in films, including The Hunchback of Rome, directed by Carlo Lizzani, and Rocco and His Brothers, directed by Luchino Visconti; both were released in 1960.

When the American television show Disneyland traveled to Italy in 1962, he appeared with Annette Funicello in two episodes of the mini-movie, Escapade in Florence, singing, playing the guitar, and adding the Italian verses to the jovial tarantella "Dream Boy".

Castelnuovo's breakthrough role arrived with The Umbrellas of Cherbourg (1964), directed by Jacques Demy, in which he played opposite Catherine Deneuve. Nominated for the American Academy Award for Best Foreign Language Film, the film gained the attention of both film critics and the public, and won the Palme d'Or at the Cannes Film Festival in February of the same year.

After the box-office failures Un mondo nuovo (1966), directed by Vittorio De Sica, and The Reward, directed by Serge Bourguignon, he gained notice as an actor in Italy because of his role of Renzo in the television mini-series I promessi sposi (1967). 

He also starred alongside an international cast in The Five Man Army (1969), directed by Don Taylor, as a Mexican revolutionary, and as Armand in Camille 2000 (1969), directed by Radley Metzger.

From then on, Castelnuovo was featured primarily on television serials around Europe, where he portrayed numerous parts. He appeared as the athletically sound spokesman for the corn-oil company Cuore from 1977 to 1982. 

Castelnuovo also appeared briefly as D'Agostino in The English Patient (1996), and he continued to be active on the Italian theatre stage. In 2002, he starred in a production of the 1931 comedy play The Front Page (Italian title, Prima Pagina).

He appeared as Kenny Butler in the 2016 The Legacy Run with sport personalities Daniela Scalia, Luca Tramontin, Marco Baron, Flavien Conne, Ivan Asic, and Stefania Bianchini.

Death
Castelnuovo died on 6 September 2021 in Rome at the age of 84.

Selected filmography

References

External links

 
 
 

1936 births
2021 deaths
20th-century Italian male actors
21st-century Italian male actors
Italian male film actors
Italian male stage actors
Italian male television actors
Male Spaghetti Western actors
People from Lecco